Mom or Dad? is a 2017 Italian comedy film directed by Riccardo Milani.

It is a remake of the 2015 French film Daddy or Mommy (Papa ou maman).

Cast
Antonio Albanese as Nicola Vignali
Paola Cortellesi as Valeria Mozzati
Carlo Buccirosso as Gianrico Bertelli
Matilde Gioli as Melania
Luca Angeletti as Giorgio
Roberto De Francesco as Federico
Stefania Rocca as Sonia
Claudio Gioè as Furio
Marianna Cogo as Viola
Luca Marino as Matteo
Alvise Marascalchi as Giulietto

References

External links

2017 films
2010s Italian-language films
2017 comedy films
Italian remakes of French films
Italian comedy films
Films directed by Riccardo Milani
2010s Italian films